Rockville Township is one of twenty-four townships in Bates County, Missouri, and is part of the Kansas City metropolitan area within the USA.  As of the 2000 census, its population was 271.

Rockville Township was established in 1872, taking its name from Rockville, Missouri.

Geography
According to the United States Census Bureau, Rockville Township covers an area of 25.17 square miles (65.19 square kilometers); of this, 24.67 square miles (63.89 square kilometers, 98.01 percent) is land and 0.5 square miles (1.3 square kilometers, 1.99 percent) is water.

Cities, towns, villages
 Rockville

Adjacent townships
 Hudson Township (north)
 Appleton Township, St. Clair County (northeast)
 Taber Township, St. Clair County (east)
 Speedwell Township, St. Clair County (southeast)
 Bacon Township, Vernon County (south)
 Blue Mound Township, Vernon County (southwest)
 Prairie Township (west)
 Pleasant Gap Township (northwest)

Cemeteries
The township contains Rockville Cemetery.

Airports and landing strips
 Heiman Field

Lakes
 Horseshoe Lake
 Jones Lake

School districts
 Appleton City R-II
 Rich Hill R-IV

Political districts
 Missouri's 4th congressional district
 State House District 120
 State Senate District 31

References
 United States Census Bureau 2008 TIGER/Line Shapefiles
 United States Board on Geographic Names (GNIS)
 United States National Atlas

External links
 US-Counties.com
 City-Data.com

Townships in Bates County, Missouri
Townships in Missouri